"Loadsamoney (Doin' Up the House)" is a novelty song by the English comedian Harry Enfield. It was released as a single on 25 April 1988 through Mercury Records, peaking at No.  4 on the UK Singles Chart. The song contains a brief sample of the ABBA song "Money, Money, Money", as well as the song "Money, Money" from the 1972 film Cabaret, performed by Liza Minnelli and Joel Grey, and a short sample of "Money" by the Flying Lizards. There are also two brief references to the song "Big Spender".

Background
The Loadsamoney character was created in reaction to the policies of the Thatcher government of the day. The song also spawned a sold-out live tour. In May 1988, Labour Party leader Neil Kinnock used the term loadsamoney to criticise the policies of the Conservative government and journalists began to refer to the "loadsamoney mentality" and the "loadsamoney economy".

Track listing

7" vinyl
 Mercury — DOSH 1

12" vinyl
 Mercury — DOSH 112

Charts

Release history

References

External links
 

1988 songs
1988 singles
Novelty songs
Internet memes
Harry Enfield
Mercury Records singles